The Immaculate Collection is the first commercially released music video compilation by American singer-songwriter Madonna. Released by Warner Music Vision, Warner Reprise Video and Sire Records on November 13, 1990 to accompany the audio release, it contained music videos for singles released between 1983 and 1990. The collection won "Best Long Form Video" category at the 1991 MTV Video Music Awards.

Formats
The music video was released on VHS, LaserDisc, VCD (Asia only) and later DVD. It includes the first showing of the video to "Oh Father" (1989) which is not included on the audio release and had not been a single in some countries. The cover to this release was different from the audio version as it incorporated the back cover image from the CD/LP with the logo in the bottom right corner

The video was also included in the double box set The Ultimate Collection which also contained The Video Collection 93:99 (1999). It is also included the 3 VHS box set The Madonna Collection in 2000, which also include Madonna Live: The Virgin Tour and The Girlie Show: Live Down Under.

Critical reception 

Giving the release a positive review, Russell Brown from Select magazine noted the absence of many of Madonna's videos, and stated: "So there it is: good sex, bad sex, dominance, submission, money, religion, race, image, reality, sleaze and innocence. Pop culture comes no better and we should be grateful." According to Greg Kot of Chicago Tribune, the video "give[s] a good overview of Madonna's eight-year career." Giving it three out of five stars, Los Angeles Times Chris Willman opined that "the imagery in almost all of the dozen clips collected here has already entered the realm of popular fantasy", but pointed out that "yet few of these hold up as great videos".

Commercial performance 
The Immaculate Collection debuted at number four on Billboards Top Music Videos and fourteen at Top Videos sales on December 8, 1990. Eventually the video compilation reached the number one in the Top Music Videos. After Nielsen Soundscan started tracking sales from March 1991, the video sold 291,000 copies as of 2010. Across Europe, the video compilation moved 300,000 units as of January 1991.

Track listing

Notes
"Lucky Star": VHS includes the original version of the video, which is the 7" version and the Laserdisc and DVD formats include the U.S. Remix version, which contains additional footage.
"Express Yourself": features an edited version of the video, which is based on the 7" version instead of the Shep Pettibone video remix.

Charts

Weekly charts

Monthly charts

Year-end charts

Certifications and sales

Credits and personnel
Producers
Michele Ferrone ("Borderline")
Simon Fields ("Like A Virgin")
Gregg Fienberg ("Express Yourself")
Glenn Goodwin ("Lucky Star")
Bruce Logan ("Borderline")
David Naylor ("Papa Don't Preach", "Open Your Heart" and "La Isla Bonita")
Vicki Niles ("Oh Father" and "Vogue")
Sharon Oreck ("Material Girl", "Papa Don't Preach", "Open Your Heart", "La Isla Bonita", "Like A Prayer" and "Cherish")

Photography directors
Michael Ballhaus ("Papa Don't Preach")
Jordan Cronenweth ("Oh Father")
Andrea Dietrich ("Borderline")
Wayne Isham ("Lucky Star")
Pascal Lebegue ("Open Your Heart" and "Vogue")
Bryan Loftus ("La Isla Bonita")
Mark Plummer ("Express Yourself")
Steven Poster ("Like A Prayer")
Herb Ritts ("Cherish")
Peter Sinclair ("Like A Virgin" and "Material Girl")

References

External links

1990 video albums
Music video compilation albums
Madonna video albums
Madonna compilation albums
Warner Records video albums
Reprise Records video albums
Sire Records video albums
Warner Music Vision video albums